Kevin Garcia (born August 21, 1990) is a retired American soccer player who played as a defender.

Career

Youth and college
Garcia played his high school soccer at St. Francis Prep in Fresh Meadows Queens, where he won the NYC Championship in his junior year.  Kevin was elected to the all-city team sophomore, junior and senior year.  Garcia played four years of college soccer for the Villanova University Wildcats between 2008 and 2011.

Garcia also appeared for Premier Development League side Long Island Rough Riders between 2010 and 2013.

Professional
On January 17, 2012, Garcia was drafted 41st overall in the 2012 MLS Supplemental Draft by New England Revolution. However, he didn't sign with the club.

IFK Luleå 
Garcia joined Swedish club IFK Luleå in July 2013. He made his debut for IFK Luleå on August 25 in a 2–0 loss in a Division 1 match against Sirius.  Garcia would go on to make 9 appearances in his first season in Sweden as IFK Luleå finished 5th in the Norra division.

On August 5, 2014, Garcia scored his first goal for IFK Luleå in a Svenska Cupen match with Sandviks IK. Trailing 2–1 late, Garcia scored in the 90th minute to level the score at 2 and send the game to extra time, where IFK Luleå would go on to win. On August 10, Garcia would play late hero once again, this time in the league. Garcia managed to score his first league goal in the 82nd minute to give IFK Luleå a 2–1 win over IF Sylvia. Overall, Garcia enjoyed a more successful season in 2014, making 23 appearances and scoring 3 goals in all competitions, but it was a worse season for the club, dropping to 10th in the Norra table.

Galway United 
On March 23, 2015, Garcia signed with Irish club Galway United. He made his debut for the Tribesmen on March 24 in a 2–0 loss to Cork City. After making 13 appearances for Galway United, Garcia was released on July 30, 2015.

Västerås SK 
On  August 3, 2015, Garcia returned to Sweden to sign with Division 1 club Västerås SK Fotboll. He made his Västerås SK debut on August 20 in a Svenska Cupen match with AFC Eskilstuna, a 3–3 match that saw Eskilstuna advance on penalties. Garcia made his league debut for Västerås SK on August 23 in a 3–2 win over Nyköpings BIS.  He ended the season with 12 appearances across all competitions as Västerås SK finished 10th in the Norra division.

Rio Grande Valley FC 
Garcia joined new United Soccer League side Rio Grande Valley FC Toros on January 29, 2016. Garcia made his Toros debut on March 26 in a 2–0 win over the Tulsa Roughnecks. He scored his first goal for RGVFC on June 4 to give the Toros a 1–0 win over San Antonio FC. Garcia captained the Toros to a 10–game unbeaten run, allowing 1 goal in that span and keeping a 760-minute shutout streak.

Houston Dynamo 
On September 6, 2016 Garcia was rewarded for his strong play by signing a contract with the Toros' MLS affiliate, the Houston Dynamo. He would make the bench for 2 games, but would end up back with RGVFC on loan for the rest of the year, helping the Toros reach the playoffs, where they lost in the first round 3–2 to the Oklahoma City Energy.

Garcia made his MLS and Dynamo debut on April 15, 2017 in a 2–2 draw with Minnesota United.  Garcia made 5 total appearances for the Dynamo during the 2017 season, spending the rest of the season on the bench for the Dynamo or on loan with the Toros.

In 2018, Garcia missed 2 months due to a muscle injury. He made 4 appearances in the US Open Cup, including coming on as a sub in the final, to help the Dynamo win their first ever Open Cup. Garcia scored his first MLS goal on October 21 in a 3–2 loss to the Seattle Sounders.  He made 15 appearances and scored 1 goal in MLS play as the Dynamo finished 9th in the Western Conference, failing to qualify for the playoffs.

Garcia made his first appearance of 2019 on March 2, getting the start in a 1–1 draw with Real Salt Lake in the first league match of the season. He made his first appearance in a continental competition of his career on March 12, coming on as a sub in a 1–0 loss to Tigres in the CONCACAF Champions League quarter-finals. Garcia made 16 appearances across all competitions for the Dynamo, 12 of them coming in MLS as Houston finished 10th in the West to miss the playoffs again. He also made 2 appearances for the Toros in April.  His contract with Houston expired following the 2019 season.

FC Tulsa 
On March 3, 2020, Garcia joined USL Championship side FC Tulsa ahead of the 2020 season.  He made his debut for Tulsa on March 7, playing the full 90 minutes in a 1–1 draw with Sacramento Republic.  In a shortened season due to the COVID-19 pandemic, Garcia started all 15 games for Tulsa, playing every minute to help them reach the playoffs for the first time since 2017.  Tulsa fell in the first round of the playoffs 4-2 on penalties to El Paso Locomotive, with Garica playing the full 120 minutes of the match.  On December 17, Garcia re-signed with Tulsa for the 2021 season.

Garcia scored his first goal for Tulsa on October 20, 2021 in a 4–0 win over Atlanta United 2.  He ended the season with 25 appearances and 1 goal to help Tulsa qualify for the playoffs, however he did not appear in their playoff game, a 6–2 loss to the Tampa Bay Rowdies.

Following the 2021 season, Garcia announced his retirement.

Career Statistics

Honors

Club

Houston Dynamo 

 US Open Cup: 2018

Personal life
Garcia has Colombian heritage.

References

http://www.elitefootball.com/player/kevin-garcia/22209

External links

Villanova Wildcats bio

1990 births
Living people
American expatriate soccer players
American expatriate sportspeople in Ireland
American expatriate sportspeople in Sweden
American sportspeople of Colombian descent
American soccer players
Association football defenders
Expatriate association footballers in Ireland
Expatriate footballers in Sweden
FC Tulsa players
Galway United F.C. players
Houston Dynamo FC players
IFK Luleå players
League of Ireland players
Long Island Rough Riders players
Major League Soccer players
New England Revolution draft picks
People from Flushing, Queens
Rio Grande Valley FC Toros players
Sportspeople from Queens, New York
Soccer players from New York City
USL Championship players
USL League Two players
Västerås SK Fotboll players
Villanova Wildcats men's soccer players